Huddersfield Town's 1964–65 campaign was mainly a season of change for the Town, with Roger B. Kaye becoming the new chairman just before the start of the season, followed by the departure of manager Eddie Boot after just 3 games. Tom Johnston would then give Town a big boost for the rest of the season. A superb second half of the season saw Town only lose 3 league games in 1965, which would eventually lead Town to 8th place in Division 2.

Squad at the start of the season

Review
Following the previous season's mid-table position, gates at Leeds Road drastically fell, no match recorded a crowd of more than 15,000 during the season. It wasn't helped by the dreadful start made by the Town, which cost Eddie Boot his job in early September. Town failed to win any of their first 9 matches. Tom Johnston would replace Boot and brought in Jimmy Nicholson, Tony Leighton and Johnny Quigley. But, Town's form didn't seem to completely improve until Town reached December.

Town's new acquisitions would help Town's form improve during the second half of the season, which would see Town lose only 3 times in the second half of the season. It would see Town finish in 8th place with 44 points, 12 points behind 2nd placed Northampton Town.

Squad at the end of the season

Results

Division Two

FA Cup

Football League Cup

Appearances and goals

1964-65
English football clubs 1964–65 season